Cremia is a comune (municipality) in the Province of Como in the Italian region Lombardy, located about  north of Milan and about  northeast of Como, on the western shore of Lake Como.

Cremia borders the following municipalities: Dervio, Garzeno, Pianello del Lario, Plesio, San Siro.

References

External links
Official website

Cities and towns in Lombardy